After the dissolution of the Soviet Union, Azerbaijan and Ukraine gained their independence from the Soviet Union and started a close friendship with establishing diplomatic relations in 1992. The relations of strategic cooperation, political, economical and cultural relations between two countries are at a very high level. In 2001, the two countries founded the Organization for Democracy and Economic Development (GUAM), along with Georgia and Moldova. Azerbaijan currently plays an important role in both organization and the foreign policy of Ukraine due to its strategic role in the region. Azerbaijan also helped Ukraine to shelter Chernobyl sarcophagus.

Ukraine is, after Turkey and Israel, one of the main military partners of Azerbaijan. Azeri officers are trained in Ukrainian military academies, and various technical assistance is supplied by Ukraine. Ukraine supports Azerbaijan's position in the resolution of the Nagorno-Karabakh conflict against Armenia. After Black January events, some 10,000 people attended a rally in Lviv to protest Moscow's military intervention in Azerbaijan. There are about 32.000 Ukrainians that live in Azerbaijan, and over 45,000 Azerbaijanis live in Ukraine. The grave of Ukrainian Ataman Golovati still is protected by Azerbaijanis and there's also monument in Lankaran dedicated to Cossacks. The two countries support each other in entering international organizations. Diplomatic relations were established in 1919 for the first time and Azerbaijan recognizes Holodomor events as a genocide.

Political relations
Relations between two countries are very friendly. Diplomatic relations between the two countries were established in 1992. Azerbaijan has an embassy in Kyiv. Ukraine has an embassy in Baku. Both countries are full members of the Council of Europe, the Organization for Security and Co-operation in Europe (OSCE), Eastern Partnership, Organization of the Black Sea Economic Cooperation (BSEC) as well as GUAM. 

Azerbaijani president Abulfaz Elchibey paid an official visit to Ukraine on November 12, 1992. During that visit, he said that relations with Ukraine will become priority out of all of the former republics of the former Soviet Union. 

President of Ukraine Leonid Kuchma paid an official visit to Azerbaijan on July 26–28, 1995. President Heydar Aliyev paid an official visit to Ukraine on March 24–25, 1997. During the meeting, Aliyev was awarded with the Order of Prince Yaroslav the Wise. After the establishment of GUAM strategic relations started to develop rapidly. Aliyev visited Ukraine in 1999 in order to take part at the inauguration ceremony of Kuchma. The Ukrainian President paid an official visit to Azerbaijan on March 16–17, 2000. As a result of the visit, Aliyev presented Kuchma with the Istiglal Order. President Volodymyr Zelenskyy paid a visit to Azerbaijan on December 17–18, 2019. During the visit, Zelenskyy had a one-on-one meeting with the President of Azerbaijan Ilham Aliyev after which they hold negotiations in an expanded format. Following the expanded meeting, the sides signed bilateral documents such as Protocol of Intent between Ganja and Odessa, an Agreement on trade, economic, scientific, technical, and cultural cooperation between Guba and Truskavets, Agreement on cooperation between the Ministry of Economy of Azerbaijan and the State Regulatory Service of Ukraine on the conditions of doing business. Ukrainian President also met with the Prime Minister Ali Asadov, took part in the Ukrainian-Azerbaijani Business Forum, visited the Ukrainian Cultural and Educational Center of Baku Slavic University and met with representatives of Ukrainian community in Azerbaijan.

Economic relations 

In the post-Soviet space, Ukraine has been considered the second most important trade partner of Azerbaijan after the Russian Federation. Ukraine is one of the main import partners of Azerbaijan, and Azerbaijan grants Ukraine exclusive conditions for oil supply. Main goods imported from Ukraine to Azerbaijan remains as mainly metallurgy products, machine-building products, agro-industrial products, and chemical industry products. While main goods exported from Azerbaijan to Ukraine are generally Products of the fuel energy industry, chemical industry products, and agro-industrial products.

The trade turnover between the two countries reached $1.4 billion in 2010. According to the reports of the Azerbaijani State Customs Committee, the transactions between them amounted to $343.87 million during the first period of 2018, and $146.57 million was made by the Azerbaijan side as a result of its exports. The trade turnover between Azerbaijan and Ukraine in January 2019 exceeded $74 million, about half in each direction. The volume of trade started to shift upward in 2005 and amounted to approximately $ 1.5 billion in 2011 (the highest point). During this period Azerbaijan gained $ 909 million, Ukraine retained $ 558 million by mutual trade partnership, respectively. Nevertheless, starting from 2012, the trade turnover between them, worsened and declined below the statistics of 2011. The situation only changed between 2016 and 2017 so that trade volume rose up to $800 million from $300. In 2018, the number of transactions between Azerbaijan and Ukraine amounted to about $ 829 million that was around $ 18 million compared to 2017. In that year, Azerbaijan import imported approximately $469 million worth of products and while exported $358 million 738 thousand worth of products to Ukraine. So, the Azerbaijani side had current account surpluses while Ukraine had a current account deficit. Moreover, the direct investments from Ukraine to Azerbaijan amounted to more than $25 million, and from Azerbaijan to Ukraine was around $200 million. As a result of improvements in economic cooperation between Azerbaijan and Ukraine, the first Trade House of Azerbaijan was opened in the capital of Ukraine, and similar projects are estimated to be implemented in the other regions of Ukraine. The Azerbaijan Trade House has been launched to deal with promote “Made in Azerbaijan” brand in the Ukrainian market, and also it is expected to promote the general exports of the products of Azerbaijan.

The State Oil Company of Azerbaijan Republic (SOCAR) is considered one of the key players to increase transactions between Azerbaijan and Ukraine. So as a result of its investments in Ukraine, it has 9 petrol filling stations in Odessa and Mykolaiv regions of Ukraine, and in capital Kyiv and has further plan to establish more petrol filling stations in various regions of the country.

Additionally, in 2009, SOCAR purchased the Naftonreyd oil base in that country which has the 25,250 m3 and an annual turnover of 200 thousand m3.

Military cooperation
In 2006, Ukraine had sold 48 T-72AG to Azerbaijan. In 2009, Ukraine supplied to Azerbaijan, 29 BTR-70, 29 units of 122-millimeter self-propelled howitzers 2S1 Pink and 6 units of 152-millimeter self-propelled howitzers 2S3 Acacia a combat trainer MiG-29UB, 11 Mi-24. In 2010, Ukraine has been sold to Azerbaijan a 71 BTR-70, 7 self-propelled artillery "Carnation" 2S1 122 mm, 1 Mi-24P, a managed anti-missile complex, and 3,000 rifles and pistols. Ukraine remains as one of the main military partners of Azerbaijan. 

One month before the 2022 Russian invasion of Ukraine, Azerbaijan transferred three MiG-29 to a Ukrainian facility for repairs.

Cultural relations

Since 1998, Ukrainian has been taught in Baku Slavic University and the Ukrainian sector opened afterward. In 2001 in Kyiv, the Heydar Aliyev Social and Political Science Institutes was opened. Since 1978 a library named Samed Vurgun is active in Ukraine. At the same year, a short documentary called Azerbaijani days in Ukraine released and year after From the eyes of the friends documentary was shot which was about the Ukrainian culture days in Azerbaijan. Monument of Taras Shevchenko was opened in Azerbaijan in 2008.

Resident diplomatic missions 
 Azerbaijan has an embassy in Kyiv.
 Ukraine has an embassy in Baku.

See also 
 Azerbaijanis in Ukraine
 Foreign relations of Azerbaijan
 Foreign relations of Ukraine

References

External links 
 Embassy of Azerbaijan in Ukraine
 Embassy of Ukraine in Azerbaijan

 
Ukraine
Bilateral relations of Ukraine